Carl Johan Wilhelm Brannefalk (born 9 December 1997) is a Swedish footballer who plays for League Of Ireland side Sligo Rovers.

Career
Brannefalk left Trelleborg at the end of 2018, together with four other teammates. On 31 January 2019, he then joined Ljungskile.

On 19 January 2021, Brannefalk signed a two-year contract with Norrby.

On 14 November 2022, it was announced that Brannefalk had signed for League of Ireland Premier Division club Sligo Rovers for the 2023 season.

References

External links
Johan Brannefalk at Fotbolltransfers

1997 births
Living people
Swedish footballers
Association football midfielders
Trelleborgs FF players
Ljungskile SK players
Norrby IF players
Sligo Rovers F.C. players
Superettan players
Allsvenskan players
Ettan Fotboll players
League of Ireland players
Expatriate association footballers in the Republic of Ireland